Juan Esteban Melo (born November 11, 1976) is a former second baseman in Major League Baseball. He played for the San Francisco Giants.

References

External links

1976 births
Living people
Arizona League Padres players
Azucareros del Este players
Cafeteros de Córdoba players
Clinton LumberKings players
Colorado Springs Sky Sox players
Diablos Rojos del México players
Dominican Republic expatriate baseball players in Canada
Dominican Republic expatriate baseball players in Italy
Dominican Republic expatriate baseball players in Mexico
Dominican Republic expatriate baseball players in the United States
Fargo-Moorhead RedHawks players
Fresno Grizzlies players
Harrisburg Senators players
Indianapolis Indians players
Lancaster Barnstormers players

Leones del Escogido players
Major League Baseball second basemen
Major League Baseball players from the Dominican Republic
Mexican League baseball second basemen
Mexican League baseball shortstops
Mexican League baseball third basemen
Mobile BayBears players
New Orleans Zephyrs players
People from Baní
Québec Capitales players
Rancho Cucamonga Quakes players
Rimini Baseball Club players
Rio Grande Valley WhiteWings players
San Francisco Giants players
Spokane Indians players
St. George Roadrunners players
St. George Starzz players
Syracuse SkyChiefs players
Tigres del Licey players
Tijuana Cimarrones players